Sweat Spire is a 7,580-foot-elevation (2,310 meter) summit located in the Olympic Mountains, in Jefferson County of Washington state. It is situated within Olympic National Park, and is set within the Daniel J. Evans Wilderness. It is part of The Needles range, which is a subset of the Olympic range. The nearest higher peak is Mount Johnson,  to the southwest, and Gasp Pinnacle (7,520 ft) is to the immediate north. The spire is in the rain shadow of the Olympic Range, resulting in less precipitation than Mount Olympus and the western Olympics receive. Precipitation runoff from the mountain drains east into Royal Creek, and west into Gray Wolf River, which are both within the drainage basin of the Dungeness River. Topographic relief is significant as the east aspect rises over 2,400 feet (730 m) above Royal Basin in approximately one mile. The first ascent of the 200-foot-tall spire was made in 1962 by Hilton Keith, Joel Merkel, Joe Munson, and Jim Parolini. This landform's name has not been officially adopted by the U.S. Board on Geographic Names, so the feature is not labeled on USGS maps.

Climate

Sweat Spire is located in the marine west coast climate zone of western North America. Most weather fronts originate in the Pacific Ocean, and travel east toward the Olympic Mountains. As fronts approach, they are forced upward by the peaks of the Olympic Range, causing them to drop their moisture in the form of rain or snowfall (Orographic lift). As a result, the Olympics experience high precipitation, especially during the winter months in the form of snowfall. During winter months, weather is usually cloudy, but due to high pressure systems over the Pacific Ocean that intensify during summer months, there is often little or no cloud cover during the summer. Because of maritime influence, snow tends to be wet and heavy, resulting in avalanche danger. The months July through September offer the most favorable weather for climbing Sweat Spire.

See also

 The Needles (Olympic Mountains)
 Geology of the Pacific Northwest

References

External links
 Sweat Spire photo: Flickr
 

Mountains of Washington (state)
Olympic Mountains
Mountains of Jefferson County, Washington
Landforms of Olympic National Park
North American 2000 m summits